Mont Limon is the highest point on the Mauritian island of Rodrigues, with a height of . It is located approximately four kilometres south-east of the island's capital, Port Mathurin.

See also
Mont Malartic

References

External links 

 Mont Limon at Geoview.info

Mountains of Mauritius
Mountains of Rodrigues
Mont Malartic

Highest points